Song Man Lei (born 1966)  is a Macanese judge. She is the first female judge to sit on Macau's highest appellate court, the Court of Final Appeal.

Early life 
Song Man Lei studied law, earning a law degree and master's degree at Beijing University. She also attended language and law classes at the University of Coimbra and Macau University. She completed her judicial training from the Center for Training Macau Magistrates.

Career 
Song Man Lei worked as a senior local magistrate, later joining Macau's Public Prosecutor Office in 1966, In March 2000, she was appointed Deputy Prosecutor, and served in that role until 2011. She was Macau's first women delegate in the local prosecutor's office.

In 2012, she became the first woman to be appointed a judge in Macau's highest court, the Court of Final Appeal. She replaced Judge Chu Kim, who died in a car accident in China in 2011. 

Along with her duties as a judge, she participated in legal education, teaching at a Chinese judicial training institute (the National College of Magistrates). During her time as a judge on the Court of Final Appeal, she notably indicted her former supervisor, prosecutor Ho Chio Meng, for multiple offenses including fraud, money laundering and criminal association, and sentenced him to prison for 21 years along with a significant fine. Song Man Lei had previously worked as assistant general prosecutor while he headed the Public Prosecutor's Office. During sentencing, Song Man Lei described Ho Chio Meng's conduct as having "tarnished the reputation" of the prosecutor's office. She was also selected twice (in 2011, and in 2019) to serve as the Chair of an election committee, whose function is to scrutinize the results of Macau's general election, and manage the electoral process.

References 

1966 births
Macanese people
Macau judges
Living people